Samuel Pökälä (born 14 August 1990) is a Finnish former professional cyclist. He rode at the 2013 UCI World Time Trial Championships, where he finished in 64th place, and he won the Finnish National Road Race Championships in 2015. In 2021, Pökälä was the winner of the world middle distance and mass start championships in mountain bike orienteering.

At the 2022 European MTB Orienteering Championships in Ignalina, Lithuania Pökälä won silver medal in long distance orienteering race.

Major results

2013
 1st  Time trial, National Road Championships
2014
 National Road Championships
1st  Time trial
3rd Road race
2015
 National Road Championships
1st  Road race
1st  Time trial
 7th Scandinavian Race Uppsala
2016
 1st  Time trial, National Road Championships
2017
 3rd Time trial, National Road Championships

References

External links

1990 births
Living people
Finnish male cyclists
European Games competitors for Finland
Cyclists at the 2015 European Games
Finnish orienteers